Shut the Box is a strategy puzzle video game of chance based on the dice game of the same name, developed and published by American indie studio RCMADIAX. Reviews were mixed upon release.

Gameplay
Players roll the dice and select the number of tiles that correspond with the number rolled. They can take one or more tiles to gain the number. All the tiles must be eliminated for a perfect score.

Release

Shut the Box was released on the Nintendo eShop on August 7, 2014, and was rated E by the Entertainment Software Rating Board. Critical reviews of the game were mixed, with aggregate scores of 51.67% and 46 out of 100 on GameRankings and Metacritic respectively.

References

2014 video games
Puzzle video games
Strategy video games
Video games developed in the United States
Wii U eShop games
Wii U-only games
Wii U games
Single-player video games
Video games based on board games